James, Jim or Jimmy Nuttall may refer to

James Nuttall (1840-1907), British runner
Jimmy Nuttall (footballer, born 1899) (1899-1945), English Footballer
James W. Nuttall (born 1953), United States Army Major General